Barq ("lightning") is a laser-guided air-to-surface missile developed by Pakistan.

Operational history 
 
The missile was unveiled on 13 March 2015 being fired from the NESCOM Burraq unmanned combat aerial vehicle, capable of destroying both stationary and moving targets. On 28 November 2021 it was displayed being fired from Shahpar-II UCAV. Its first operational use was carried out against militants in Operation Zarb-e-Azb, on 6 September 2015, successfully eliminating three high-value targets.

See also
AGM-114 Hellfire
HJ-10
Polyphem
XM501 Non-Line-of-Sight Launch System
 ALAS (missile)
AGM-169 Joint Common Missile
HOT (missile)
Spike (missile)
PARS 3 LR
Nag
Related lists
List of anti-tank guided missiles

References

Air-to-surface missiles of Pakistan
Weapons and ammunition introduced in 2015